Alfred Barlow (born 31 August 1915 in Little Lever, Lancashire – died 9 May 1983 in Middleton, Lancashire) was an English cricketer who played as a wicket-keeper. He played 74 first-class matches for Lancashire between 1947 and 1951, and was selected to represent the Commonwealth XI for a tour of India and Ceylon in the winter of 1950/51.

References
Alfred Barlow player profile at CricketArchive

1915 births
1983 deaths
People from Little Lever
English cricketers
Lancashire cricketers
Commonwealth XI cricketers